The 1936 Winter Olympics, officially known by the International Olympic Committee as the IV Olympic Winter Games, were a multi-sport event held in Garmisch-Partenkirchen, Germany, from February 6 through February 16, 1936. A total of 646 athletes representing 28 National Olympic Committees (NOCs) participated at the Games in 17 events across 8 disciplines.

The Olympic programme was changed from that of the 1932 Lake Placid Olympics, with the addition of alpine skiing for both men and women. Two demonstration sports were held—eisschiessen and military patrol.  Later added to the regular programme as biathlon, military patrol made its third appearance as a demonstration sport in the Garmisch-Partenkirchen Games. Both men and women participated at these Games, with the women's alpine skiing event being the first medal event women contested at the Winter Olympics outside of figure skating. Two figure skating events for women—ladies' singles and pairs—had been part of the programme since the first Winter Olympics.

A total of 95 athletes won medals at the Games. Norway topped the medal count with fifteen medals, seven of which were gold. Sweden had the second most number of medals with seven, but had one less gold medal than host nation Germany, who had three golds and six overall medals. Austria, Finland, Germany, Great Britain, Norway, Sweden, Switzerland and the United States won medals in more than one event. Athletes from 11 of the 28 participating NOCs won at least a bronze medal; athletes from eight countries won at least one gold. Great Britain's unexpected win in ice hockey remains their only Olympic gold medal in the sport to date.

Sonja Henie of Norway won her third straight gold medal in the ladies' singles figure skating event, her last Olympic medal as she turned professional shortly after the Games. Karl Schäfer of Austria also successfully defended his men's singles figure skating title from Lake Placid. Sweden swept the medals in the cross-country 50 km, as did Norway in the Nordic combined.  Norway's Ivar Ballangrud was the most successful athlete, winning three golds and a silver in speed skating and taking his career total to seven Olympic medals. Other multiple medal winners were Oddbjørn Hagen of Norway (one gold, two silvers), Ernst Baier of Germany (one gold, one silver), Joseph Beerli of Switzerland (one gold, one silver), Erik August Larsson of Sweden (one gold, one bronze), Birger Wasenius of Finland (two silvers, one bronze), Olaf Hoffsbakken of Norway (two silvers), Fritz Feierabend of Switzerland (two silvers) and Sverre Brodahl of Norway (one silver, one bronze).

Alpine skiing

Bobsleigh

Cross-country skiing

Figure skating

Ice hockey

Nordic combined

Ski jumping

Speed skating

Multiple medallists
Athletes who won multiple medals are listed below.

See also
1936 Winter Olympics medal table

References

External links

 
 

1936 Winter Olympics
1936 Winter Olympics medal winners
 
medal winners